The American Eagles men's wrestling team represents American University in Washington, D.C. in NCAA Division I competition. The school's team competes in the Eastern Intercollegiate Wrestling Association (EIWA) (the Patriot League, the Eagles' primary conference, does not sponsor wrestling) and have their home matches in Bender Arena.

Through the 2015–16 season, American can claim nine All-Americans with a combined seventeen honors.

History

Cody era (2001–2011)

When Mark Cody began coaching at American, he transformed an almost extinct team into a nationally ranked team. Because of him, the Eagles were able to gain a National Champion and 14 All-Americans. Here's a breakdown of the years starting with Cody's 1st All-American.

In 2004–05, Daniel Waters received All-American status by placing 8th at Nationals, becoming the first wrestler in AU history to gain that honor.

In 2005–06, Muzaffar Abdurakhmanov placed 3rd at Nationals while Josh Glenn placed 6th. It was the first time AU had two All-Americans in the same year and the first time in AU wrestling history that American broke the Top 20 at Nationals with a 17th-place finish.

In 2006–07, Josh Glenn beat Kurt Backes from Iowa State 6-4 in the NCAA Finals. Glenn became not only the first AU wrestler to win nationals, but the first AU athlete to win a National Title. The last time an AU sport was in the finals was in 1985 when the AU Men's Soccer team lost in the NCAA Finals.

In 2007–08, Josh Glenn got 4th place at Nationals, becoming the first 3X All-American in American University Wrestling history. In addition, Michael Cannon placed 6th at Nationals.

In 2008–09, Michael Cannon placed 8th at Nationals, earning the honor a second time. In addition, Kyle Borshoff placed 7th at Nationals.

In 2009–10, for the first time in AU wrestling history, the Eagles had three All-Americans in the same year. Michael Cannon placed 3rd at Nationals, becoming the 2nd wrestler to earn 3 All-American titles. Kyle Borshoff placed 8th at Nationals, earning his 2nd All-American title in his career. Finally, Steve Fittery placed 5th at Nationals. The Eagles also placed 14th at Nationals.

In 2010–11, the American University Wrestling team not only broke multiple records, but also did the best they ever did at Nationals. Ganbayar Sanjaa placed 4th at Nationals, earning his 1st All-American title. Steve Fittery placed 3rd at Nationals, earning his 2nd All-American title in his career. Fittery also only lost one match that year. Finally, Ryan Flores became the 2nd wrestler in AU history to make it to the NCAA Finals. Unfortunately, Flores lost to Zach Rey of Lehigh 1-0. Team wise, American University placed 5th, right behind Penn State, Cornell, Iowa, and Oklahoma State. This is the best that American University have ever did in school history. Mark Cody earn National Coach of the Year, the first time he has ever earned it in his career.

A month after Nationals, Mark Cody took the head coaching job at the University of Oklahoma. Another month later, the head coach of Clarion came in to fill the spot.

Moore era (2011–2021)

In 2011–12, Teague Moore took over the team. Kyle Borshoff stepped up from volunteer assistant coach to 1st assistant coach. Pete Friedl, 3X All-American of Illinois, become the 2nd Assistant coach. Moore helped lead the eagles to a 19th-place finish at the NCAAs. Moore also led the Eagles to a 3rd-place finish at the EIWA's, the highest finish AU has accomplished ever. Moore resigned in January 2021 and former Eagles wrestler Jason Grimes was his interim replacement. American did not compete during the regular season.

Borelli era (2021-)
In April 2021, American named Jason Borelli as its new head coach. Borelli previously coached Stanford for 13 years until 2021.

Achievements

Individual
{| class="wikitable sortable" style="width:75%"
|-
! style="background:lavender;"|Category
! style="background:lavender;"|Amount
! style="background:lavender;"|Individual (year)
|-
|NCAA Champion
|1
|*Josh Glenn (2007)
|-
|NCAA All-Americans
|16
|*Daniel Waters (2005), *Muzaffar Abdurakhmanov (2006), *Josh Glenn (2006–08), *Michael Cannon (2008–10), *Kyle Borshoff (2009–10), *Steve Fittery (2010–11), *Ganbayar Sanjaa (2011–12), *Ryan Flores (2011–12)
|-
|NCAA Academic All-American
|21
|*David Lombardy (1998), *Daniel Waters (2005), *Muzaffar Abdurakhmanov (2006), *Matt Morkel (2006), *Michael Cannon (2007, 2008, 2009, 2010), *Damian Swielik (2007), *Jason Borshoff (2008, 2010), *Josh Glenn (2008), *Christopher Stout (2008), *Andrew Silber (2009), *Steve Fittery (2010, 2011), *Bubby Graham (2011), *Ryan Flores (2011–12), *Ganbayar Sanjaa (2011), *Matt Mariacher (2011–12), *Thomas Williams (2012) *Danny Mitchell (2011–12) *Kevin Tao (2012)
|-
|NCAA Qualifiers
|62
|*Rob Ferrara (1973) *Loren Danielson (1979)*Chuck Toler (1985)*Makr Shuffin (1989) *Chris Toth (1989–90) *Malone Chase (1993–94) *Rob Hjerling (1993–94) *Jacob Scott (1994–95) *Bret Ruth (1996–97) *Rob Chavez (1997) *Rob Puzio (1997–98) *Matt Esposito (1998–99) *Josh Schroeder (1999) *Marc Hoffer (1999, 2001–02) *Denis Alamplav (2000–01) *Ryan Palinger (2001) *Wille Harris (2002) *Daniel Waters (2005) *Muzaffar Abdurakhmanov (2005–06) *Adam LoPiccolo (2005–06) *Josh Glenn (2005–08) *Kyle Borshoff (2007, 2009–10) *Mike Cannon (2007–10) *Rudy Rueda (2007) *Jason Borshoff (2008) *Chris Stout (2008) *Andrew Silber (2009) *Jordan Lipp (2010) *Steve Fittery (2010–11) *Patrick Graham (2011) *Matt Mariacher (2011–12) *Ryan Flores (2011–12) *Ganbayar Sanjaa (2011–12)  *Daniel Mitchell (2010–12)  *Kevin Tao (2012–13)  *Blake Herrin (2013)   *David Terao (2013)
|-
|EIWA Champions
|12
|*Muzaffar Abdurakhmanov (2005–06), *Josh Glenn (2006–08), *Michael Cannon (2009–10), *Steve Fittery (2011), *Matt Mariacher (2011–12), *Ryan Flores (2011–12)
|-
|Midlands Champions
|3
|*Josh Glenn (2007), *Michael Cannon (2008), *Steve Fittery (2009/2011)
|-
|NWCA All-Star Classic Invitation
|5
|*Mark Hoffer (2001)  *Kyle Borshoff (2009)  *Ryan Flores (2010)   *Ganbayar Sanjaa (2011)   *Ryan Flores (2011)   * Kevin Tao (2012)
|-
|National Coach of the Year
|1
|*Mark Cody (2011)
|-
|Elite 89
|1
|*Danny Mitchell (2012)|-
|EIWA Wrestler of the Year
|1
|Josh Glenn (2007)
|-
|EIWA Most Outstanding Wrestler
|1
|Muzaffar Abdurakhmanov (2006)
|-
|EIWA Fletcher Award
|1
|Josh Glenn (2008)
|-
|EIWA Freshman of the Year
|1
|Josh Glenn (2005)
|-
|EIWA Billy Sheridan Memorial Award
|1
|Ryan Flores (2012)
|-
|AU Senior Student-Athlete of the Year
|7
|*Brian Sulmonatti (1979) *Jacob Scott (1995) *Matt Esposito (1999) *Josh Glenn (2008) *Mike Cannon (2010) *Steve Fittery (2011) *Ryan Flores (2012)
|-
|}

Team

Individual recordsItalicized'': Current AU Wrestlers

References

External links

 

es:American University Eagles